This article is about the particular significance of the year 1802 to Wales and its people.

Incumbents
Lord Lieutenant of Anglesey – Henry Paget 
Lord Lieutenant of Brecknockshire and Monmouthshire – Henry Somerset, 5th Duke of Beaufort
Lord Lieutenant of Caernarvonshire – Thomas Bulkeley, 7th Viscount Bulkeley
Lord Lieutenant of Cardiganshire – Thomas Johnes
Lord Lieutenant of Carmarthenshire – John Vaughan  
Lord Lieutenant of Denbighshire – Sir Watkin Williams-Wynn, 5th Baronet    
Lord Lieutenant of Flintshire – Robert Grosvenor, 1st Marquess of Westminster 
Lord Lieutenant of Glamorgan – John Stuart, 1st Marquess of Bute 
Lord Lieutenant of Merionethshire - Sir Watkin Williams-Wynn, 5th Baronet
Lord Lieutenant of Montgomeryshire – vacant until 1804
Lord Lieutenant of Pembrokeshire – Richard Philipps, 1st Baron Milford
Lord Lieutenant of Radnorshire – Thomas Harley

Bishop of Bangor – William Cleaver
Bishop of Llandaff – Richard Watson
Bishop of St Asaph – Lewis Bagot (until 4 June); Samuel Horsley 
Bishop of St Davids – Lord George Murray

Events
August - Sir William and Lady Hamilton visit Milford Haven, along with Admiral Horatio Nelson. Nelson subsequently visits Monmouth and the Naval Temple on The Kymin. Also on his Welsh expedition he visits Cyfarthfa Ironworks, in recognition of its contribution to the war effort.
8 October - A Unitarian Association is formed in South Wales, with Josiah Rees and Iolo Morganwg among its leaders.
unknown dates
North Wales Baptist Association is launched by Christmas Evans.
Sir John Nicholl is elected to Parliament for the first time.
Sir Robert Williames Vaughan marries Anna Maria Mostyn, daughter of Sir Roger Mostyn, 5th Baronet.

Arts and literature

New books
Thomas Charles - The Welsh Methodists Vindicated
Abraham Rees - The New Cyclopaedia, vol. 1

Music
Edward Jones (Bardd y Brenin) - The Musical and Poetical Relicks of the Welsh Bards, vol. 2

Sport
Royal Anglesey Yacht Club founded at Beaumaris.

Births
15 July - James Allen, Bishop of St David's (d. 1897)
August - Ebenezer Thomas, poet (d. 1863)
24 August - William Rowlands (Gwilym Lleyn) (d. 1865)
26 August - George Wightwick, architect working in south west England and pioneer architectural journalist (d. 1872)
8 November
Benjamin Hall, 1st Baron Llanover (d. 1867)
William Rees (Gwilym Hiraethog), poet and author (d. 1883)
4 December - Calvert Jones, pioneer photographer (d. 1877)
12 December
John Ryland Harris, printer (d. 1823)
Isaac Williams, poet (d. 1865)
date unknown - Thomas Robert Jones, founder of The Philanthropic Order of True Ivorites (d. 1856)

Deaths
3 April - John Williams, evangelical clergyman, about 40
4 April - Lloyd Kenyon, 1st Baron Kenyon, politician and barrister, 69
26 May - Joseph Hoare, academic (b. 1709)
4 June - Lewis Bagot, Bishop of St Asaph, 62
6 July - Daniel Morgan, American pioneer, soldier, and politician of Welsh parentage, 66
28 November - Robert Roberts, preacher, 40
30 November - Thomas Williams of Llanidan, industrialist, 65
6 December - Roger Kemble, travelling theatre manager, father of Sarah Siddons, 81
31 December - Francis Lewis, signatory of the Declaration of American Independence, 80
date unknown - Abraham Elliot Griffiths, co-founder of Sierra Leone, age unknown

References

 
 Wales